The Camp Dump strike was a labor dispute that began on March 9, 1882 at the Burlington Yards in Omaha, Nebraska. The event pitted state militia against unionized strikers. It was reportedly the first strike by organized labor in Nebraska and the first Omaha riot to receive national attention.

Events
Approximately 75 workers from a Burlington Railroad grading operation began picketing at the Burlington dumping yards in Omaha. After being paid $1.25 per ten-hour day since their job began, they struck for $1.75 and rejected a compromise offer of $1.40. After parading around Downtown Omaha, the strikers formed a picket line at the dump for better pay. Hundreds of workers from other industries joined the strike in solidarity.

Nebraska Governor Albinus Nance called in the Nebraska state militia to subdue the strikers. On March 12, eight companies arrived in Omaha with the stated purpose of protecting strikebreakers. The city's first Catholic Church was used as a headquarters for the militiamen. Soon after their arrival, rioting began. During this initial surge of violence, a striker whose last name was Armstrong was killed after he tried to cross strike lines and was bayoneted by the militia.

Omaha pioneer Erastus Benson was the first lieutenant of Company H in the First Nebraska National Guards during this period. After the death, he was put in charge of the Nebraska militia. U.S. Army soldiers stationed at Fort Omaha arrived as well, bringing Gatling guns and a cannon with them.

The Army's arrival is credited with ending the violence and the strike. A number of strike leaders were arrested for "assault with intent to kill" because of fights that broke out among the picketers.

Bibliography
 Gephart, R.M. (1965) "Politicians, Soldiers and Strikers: The Reorganization of the Nebraska Militia and the Omaha Strike of 1882." Nebraska History, 45 (March), pp. 89–120.

See also
 Timeline of riots and civil unrest in Omaha, Nebraska
 History of Omaha
 Crime in Omaha

References

Labor-related riots in the United States
Riots and civil disorder in Nebraska
1882 in Nebraska
Crimes in Omaha, Nebraska
Labor disputes in Nebraska
Labor disputes in the United States
1882 labor disputes and strikes
History of Omaha, Nebraska
March 1882 events